Ashok Kumar (1911–2001) was an Indian actor.

Ashok Kumar may also refer to:
 Ashok Kumar (golfer) (born 1983), Indian golfer
 Ashok Kumar (Tamil actor) (born 1981), Tamil actor
 Kolla Ashok Kumar, Telugu actor who is known for villain roles
 Ashok Kumar (Telugu actor), Telugu actor known for comedian roles
 Ashok Kumar (British politician) (1956–2010), British Labour politician
 Ashok Kumar (cinematographer) (1941–2014), Indian cinematographer
 Ashok Kumar (field hockey) (born 1950), former Indian field hockey player
 Ashok Kumar (field hockey, born 1966), Indian Olympic hockey player
 Ashok Kumar (Indian politician) (born 1948), Indian National Congress Party politician
 Ashok Kumar (wrestler, born 1959), Indian Olympic wrestler
 Ashok Kumar Garg, Indian Olympic wrestler, born 1969
 S. Ashok Kumar (1947–2009), Indian judge
 Ashok Kumar (Pakistani politician)
 Ashok Kumar (film), a 1941 Tamil-language film
 "Ashok Kumar", an Indian placeholder name similar to John Doe